Ramon Menezes Hubner (born 30 June 1972), simply known as Ramon, is a Brazilian professional football manager and former player who played as an attacking midfielder. He is the current manager of the Brazil under-20 national team, and the interim manager of the Brazil national team.

An attacking midfielder who could also play as a forward, Ramon spent the most of his career playing for clubs in the Série A, where he amassed more than 350 matches and scored 98 goals. Mainly linked to Cruzeiro, Vasco da Gama and Vitória, he also played abroad for Bayer Leverkusen, Tokyo Verdy and Al-Gharafa before retiring with Cabofriense in 2013.

Ramon became a manager in 2015.

Playing career

Club
Ramon was born in Contagem, Minas Gerais, and finished his formation with Cruzeiro. He made his first team debut on 18 October 1987, starting in a 0–0 Copa União away draw against Flamengo.

Ramon scored his first senior goal on 17 March 1988, netting Cruzeiro's third in a 3–0 home win over Rio Branco de Andradas, for the year's Campeonato Mineiro. He was regularly used during the 1990 season, but later fell down the pecking order.

Ramon spent two periods on loan at Bahia (two months in 1992 and in 1993), but also featured sparingly. He moved to state rivals Vitória in the following year, becoming an immediate starter and scoring a career-best 25 goals in the 1995 Campeonato Baiano.

After impressing for Vitória, Ramon moved abroad and joined Bundesliga side Bayer 04 Leverkusen. He returned to his home country in 1996, signing for Vasco da Gama, and was an important unit in the club's winning run, as he lifted the 1997 Campeonato Brasileiro Série A, the 1998 Campeonato Carioca, the 1998 Copa Libertadores and the 1999 Torneio Rio – São Paulo.

In 2000, Ramon moved to Atlético Mineiro and scored the goal of the title of the year's Campeonato Mineiro. He subsequently agreed to a loan deal with Fluminense in the following year, being notably recognised by his free kick goals.

Ramon then returned to Atlético before rejoining Vasco in 2002, where he scored 15 goals in 17 league appearances to help the side avoid relegation. On 3 January 2003, he left the latter club and joined Tokyo Verdy on a 11-month contract.

Ramon returned to Flu in 2004, but struggled with injuries, and subsequently moved to Botafogo on a one-year deal. He rejoined Vasco for a third spell in January 2006, and a move to Qatar Stars League side Al-Gharafa SC subsequently followed.

Ramon signed for Atlético Paranaense on 9 January 2007, but featured sparingly. On 25 February of the following year, he returned to Vitória, but left the club in the end of the season to play in Turkish football; after playing just friendlies, he rejoined Vitória in March 2009. He left the club in December 2010, after suffering relegation.

On 3 January 2011, 38-year-old Ramon agreed to a contract with Joinville, being a regular starter during the season as his side achieved promotion from the Série C. However, in the following campaign, he only appeared rarely, which prompted to a move to Caxias in October 2012.

On 15 February 2013, at the age of 40, Ramon was presented at Cabofriense. After playing in the Campeonato Carioca Série B, he retired.

International
Called up to the 2001 FIFA Confederations Cup by manager Émerson Leão, Ramon made his full international debut for Brazil on 31 May of that year, starting and assisting Carlos Miguel in a 2–0 win against Cameroon. He scored his first goal on 7 June, netting his side's only in a 2–1 defeat to France.

Managerial career
Shortly after retiring, Ramon started working at his former club Joinville as an assistant manager. He left the club in January 2015, and was named in charge of ASEEV in August; at the latter club, he won the third division of the Campeonato Goiano.

In 2016, Ramon coached Anápolis, after agreeing to a deal with the club in July of the previous year. He was sacked in February, after just five matches, and subsequently managed Guarani-MG before returning to JEC in September, now being appointed manager. He left the club on 28 November, after failing to avoid relegation.

In May 2017, Ramon returned to Anápolis for the Série D, replacing Waldemar Lemos. He was dismissed in the following month, after four winless matches.

On 23 November 2017, Ramon was appointed manager of Tombense for the ensuing campaign. He was relieved from his duties the following 16 July, after six winless matches.

On 27 December 2018, Ramon rejoined another club he represented as a player, Vasco, as an assistant manager. On 30 March 2020, he replaced sacked Abel Braga at the helm of the main squad.

Ramon was himself dismissed on 8 October 2020, after six winless matches. On 9 November, he replaced departing Marcelo Cabo at the helm of CRB, but was sacked after just nine matches on 18 December.

On 8 June 2021, Ramon was named manager of another club he represented as a player, Vitória. He was sacked on 5 August, after only three wins in 16 matches.

On 7 March 2022, Ramon was named in charge of the Brazil under-20 national team. He won the 2023 South American U-20 Championship with the side, and was named interim manager of the full side on 15 February 2023.

Career statistics

Club

International

International goals
Scores and results list Brazil's goal tally first.

Coaching statistics

Honours

Player
Cruzeiro
 Campeonato Mineiro: 1990
 Supercopa Libertadores: 1991, 1992
 Copa do Brasil: 1993

Vitória
 Campeonato Baiano: 1995, 2008, 2009, 2010

Vasco da Gama
 Campeonato Brasileiro Série A: 1997
 Campeonato Carioca: 1998
 Copa Libertadores: 1998
 Torneio Rio – São Paulo: 1999

Atlético Minero
 Campeonato Mineiro: 2000

Joinville
 Campeonato Brasileiro Série C: 2011
 Copa Santa Catarina: 2011

Individual
 Bola de Prata: 2002

Manager
ASEEV
Campeonato Goiano Terceira Divisão: 2015

Brazil U20
 South American U-20 Championship: 2023

References

External links 
 
 
 Globo Esporte profile 

1972 births
Living people
People from Contagem
Brazilian people of German descent
Brazilian footballers
Association football midfielders
Brazil international footballers
Brazil under-20 international footballers
2001 FIFA Confederations Cup players
Campeonato Brasileiro Série A players
Campeonato Brasileiro Série B players
Campeonato Brasileiro Série C players
Bundesliga players
J1 League players
Cruzeiro Esporte Clube players
Esporte Clube Bahia players
Esporte Clube Vitória players
CR Vasco da Gama players
Clube Atlético Mineiro players
Fluminense FC players
Botafogo de Futebol e Regatas players
Club Athletico Paranaense players
Joinville Esporte Clube players
Sociedade Esportiva e Recreativa Caxias do Sul players
Associação Desportiva Cabofriense players
Bayer 04 Leverkusen players
Tokyo Verdy players
Qatar Stars League players
Al-Gharafa SC players
Copa Libertadores-winning players
Brazilian football managers
Campeonato Brasileiro Série A managers
Campeonato Brasileiro Série B managers
Campeonato Brasileiro Série C managers
Campeonato Brasileiro Série D managers
Anápolis Futebol Clube managers
Joinville Esporte Clube managers
Tombense Futebol Clube managers
CR Vasco da Gama managers
Clube de Regatas Brasil managers
Esporte Clube Vitória managers
Brazil national under-20 football team managers
Brazil national football team managers
Brazilian expatriate footballers
Brazilian expatriate sportspeople in Germany
Brazilian expatriate sportspeople in Japan
Brazilian expatriate sportspeople in Qatar
Expatriate footballers in Germany
Expatriate footballers in Japan
Expatriate footballers in Qatar
Sportspeople from Minas Gerais